The Incredible Little Richard Sings His Greatest Hits – Live! is the first of two albums Little Richard made for the Modern Records label. A live recording from  the Domino Club in Atlanta compiled from more than one concert,  all the tracks on the album have overdubbed audience noises.
Ace Records has yet to release these (plus several never issued tracks ) on CD (except one, Directly From My Heart to You). Ace reports a legal entanglement prohibiting such .

Track listing
Introduction
"Tutti Frutti"
"Keep a Knockin'"
"Rip It Up” (mis-titled as “Saturday Night Rock”)
"Jenny Jenny" (Enotris Johnson, Richard Penniman)
"Bama Lama Bama Loo" 
"Long Tall Sally" (Enotris Johnson, Richard Penniman, Robert Blackwell)
"Ready Teddy"
"Slippin' and Slidin'" (possibly a rehearsal tape)
"True Fine Mama"
"Bonnie Marone (Bony Moronie) (Bony Maronie)”
"Lucille"
"Bring It On Home to Me (mis-titled as “Bring It Back Home to Me)"
"Do You Feel It" (aka Do You Feel It ( The Second Line)”
"Whole Lotta Shakin' Goin' On"

Personnel
Little Richard – vocals, piano

Incomplete personnel listed in Modern archives - the backing band given are Little Richard's backing band, The Upsetters.

References

Little Richard albums
1967 live albums
albums produced by Robert Blackwell
Modern Records live albums